Brandon Brown (born January 14, 1985) is an American professional basketball player. Standing at 1.98 meters, he plays the power forward and at the center position. After one year at Cal State San Bernardino, Brown entered the 2010 NBA draft but was not selected in the draft's two rounds.

College career
Brown played college basketball at Mountain View, Holmes Community College and at Cal State San Bernardino, from 2006 to 2009.

Professional career
Brown went undrafted in the 2010 NBA draft. He started his professional career with Šiauliai of the Lithuanian League. The same year he also played for Sūduva and Kotwica Kołobrzeg.

During the next 5 years, Brown has played in multiple teams such as Vitória de Guimarães, Fjölnir, Lanús, Apollon Limassol, SLUC Nancy, ASC Denain-Voltaire and Anwil Włocławek.

He started the 2015–16 season with Hapoel Gilboa Galil. On January 10, he signed with Aries Trikala of the Greek League. On April 24, he signed with Al-Ahli Jeddah of the Saudi Premier League.

On September 2, 2016, Brown joined Istanbulspor Beylikduzu of the TBL.

On October 28, 2017, Brown joined Incheon ET Land Elephants of the Korean Basketball League.

In May 2020, Brown Joined Al Ahli Bahrain in the Bahraini Basketball league, leading the team along with Dominic Sutton to win the first double in 22 years, winning the league and the domestic cup competition.

In November 2021, Brown signed with the San Miguel Beermen of the Philippine Basketball Association.

References

External links
 Brandon Brown at fiba.com
 Brandon Brown at eurobasket.com
 Brandon Brown at realgm.com
 Brandon Brown at kki.is

1985 births
Living people
American expatriate basketball people in Argentina
American expatriate basketball people in Bahrain
American expatriate basketball people in China
American expatriate basketball people in Cyprus
American expatriate basketball people in Ecuador
American expatriate basketball people in France
American expatriate basketball people in Greece
American expatriate basketball people in Iceland
American expatriate basketball people in Israel
American expatriate basketball people in Lithuania
American expatriate basketball people in Mexico
American expatriate basketball people in the Philippines
American expatriate basketball people in Poland
American expatriate basketball people in Portugal
American expatriate basketball people in Saudi Arabia
American expatriate basketball people in South Korea
American expatriate basketball people in Turkey
American expatriate basketball people in Uruguay
American men's basketball players
Anyang KGC players
Apollon Limassol BC players
Aries Trikala B.C. players
Basketball players from New Orleans
BC Šiauliai players
Cal State San Bernardino Coyotes men's basketball players
Centers (basketball)
Daegu KOGAS Pegasus players
Denain Voltaire Basket players
Greek Basket League players
Halcones de Xalapa players
Hapoel Gilboa Galil Elyon players
Jeonju KCC Egis players
Junior college men's basketball players in the United States
KK Włocławek players
Lanús basketball players
Philippine Basketball Association imports
Phoenix Super LPG Fuel Masters players
Power forwards (basketball)
San Miguel Beermen players
Seoul SK Knights players
SKK Kotwica Kołobrzeg players
SLUC Nancy Basket players
Suwon KT Sonicboom players
Úrvalsdeild karla (basketball) players